Tripelennamine, sold under the brand name Pyribenzamine by Novartis, is a drug that is used as an antipruritic and first-generation antihistamine. It can be used in the treatment of asthma, hay fever, rhinitis, and urticaria, but is now less common as it has been replaced by newer antihistamines. The drug was patented at CIBA, which merged with Geigy into Ciba-Geigy, and eventually becoming Novartis.

Medical uses
Where and when it is/was in common use, tripelennamine is used much like other mildly-anticholinergic antihistamines to treat conditions of the upper respiratory tract arising from illnesses and hay fever. It can be used alone or in combination with other agents to have the desired effect. Cough medicines of the general formula tripelennamine + codeine/dihydrocodine/hydrocodone ± expectorant ± decongestant(s) are popular where available. Among these are the Pyribenzamine cough syrups which contain codeine, with and without decongestants, listed in the 1978 Physicians' Desk Reference; the codeine-tripelennamine synergy is well-known and makes such mixtures more useful for their intended purposes.

Side effects
Tripelennamine is mildly sedating. Other side effects can include irritation, dry mouth, nausea, and dizziness.

A large study on people 65 years old or older linked the development of Alzheimer's disease and other forms of dementia to the "higher cumulative" use of first-generation antihistamines, due to their anticholinergic properties.

Pharmacology

Pharmacodynamics
Tripelennamine acts primarily as an antihistamine, or H1 receptor antagonist. It has little to no anticholinergic activity, with 180-fold selectivity for the H1 receptor over the muscarinic acetylcholine receptors (for comparison, diphenhydramine had 20-fold selectivity for the H1 receptor). In addition to its antihistamine properties, tripelennamine also acts as a weak serotonin-norepinephrine-dopamine reuptake inhibitor (SNDRI).

Pharmacokinetics
The elimination half-life of tripelennamine is 4 to 6 hours. In a clinical study, the half-life of tripelennamine following intramuscular injection of 50 to 100 mg was 2.9 to 4.4 hours.

History
Tripelennamine was first synthesized in 1946 by Carl Djerassi, working in the laboratory of Charles Huttrer at CIBA, shortly after Djerassi got his B.S. It was his first patent.

Society and culture

Availability
Tripelennamine is no longer available in the United States.

See also
 Chloropyramine
 Mepyramine
 Pheniramine
 Pentazocine

References

Aminopyridines
CYP2D6 inhibitors
H1 receptor antagonists
Serotonin–norepinephrine–dopamine reuptake inhibitors